California's 19th State Assembly district is one of 80 California State Assembly districts. It is currently represented by Democrat Phil Ting of San Francisco.

District profile 
The district encompasses the western, more residential parts of San Francisco along with several of its southern suburbs in San Mateo County, making it slightly more friendly towards Republicans than the neighboring 17th District. It also includes the (uninhabited) Farallon Islands. The San Francisco side of the Golden Gate Bridge is located in this district.

San Francisco County – 41.9%

San Mateo County – 18.1%
 Broadmoor
 Colma
 Daly City
 South San Francisco – 34.3%

Election results from statewide races

List of Assembly Members 
Due to redistricting, the 19th district has been moved around different parts of the state. The current iteration resulted from the 2011 redistricting by the California Citizens Redistricting Commission.

Election results 1992 - present

2020

2018

2016

2014

2012

2010

2008

2006

2004

2002

2000

1998

1996

1994

1992

See also 
 California State Assembly
 California State Assembly districts
 Districts in California

References

External links 
 District map from the California Citizens Redistricting Commission

19
Government of San Francisco
Government of San Mateo County, California